
Tuzla Spit or Kosa Tuzla    was a long narrow peninsula or sandy spit in the eastern part of the Strait of Kerch which extended from  to the north-west in the direction of the city Kerch for almost .

History 
In 1925 the spit was cut by a storm, forming Tuzla Island. The open-water channel between Tuzla Island and the Russian mainland where the spit had previously existed reached over a kilometer in width.

Tuzla Spit consisted of the Tuzla Island and two small islands on the Russian side ( and ), and a narrow sand bar connecting them all.  The two small islands were re-connected to each other by the 2003 construction by Russia of the 4.1 km long Tuzla dam.
  
The Tuzla Spit formed the southern shore of the Taman Bay; the northern shore is the Chushka Spit.

Crimean bridge 
The remnants of the Tuzla Spit were utilized in the building of the Crimean Bridge.

See also 
 Spits of Azov Sea
 Dolgaya Spit
 Arabat Spit

References

External links
 «Остров Тузла» — Севастополь «ОК», № 1-2, 2000 г.
 «Коса Тузла» — Тамань. Ру > Фотогалерея > Коса Тузла
 Фотография окончания искусственной косы с воздуха
 Лист карты L-37-98 Тамань. Масштаб: 1 : 100 000. Состояние местности на 1988 год. Издание 1989 г.
 Лист карты L-37-XXV Аршинцево. Масштаб: 1:200 000. Издание 1982 г.

Destroyed landforms
Spits of the sea of Azov
Spits of Crimea
Spits of Krasnodar Krai
Kerch Strait